The Berber Revolt of 740–743 AD (122–125 AH in the Islamic calendar) took place during the reign of the Umayyad Caliph Hisham ibn Abd al-Malik and marked the first successful secession from the Arab caliphate (ruled from Damascus). Fired up by Kharijite puritan preachers, the Berber revolt against their Umayyad Arab rulers began in Tangiers in 740, and was led initially by Maysara al-Matghari. The revolt soon spread through the rest of the Maghreb (North Africa) and across the straits to al-Andalus.

The Umayyads scrambled and managed to prevent the core of Ifriqiya (Tunisia, East-Algeria and West-Libya) and al-Andalus (Spain and Portugal) from falling into rebel hands. But the rest of the Maghreb was never recovered. After failing to capture the Umayyad provincial capital of Kairouan, the Berber rebel armies dissolved, and the western Maghreb fragmented into a series of small Berber statelets, ruled by tribal chieftains and Kharijite imams. 
 
The Berber revolt was probably the largest military setback in the reign of Caliph Hisham. From it, emerged some of the first Muslim states outside the Caliphate.

Background
The underlying causes of the revolt were the policies of the Umayyad governors in Kairouan, Ifriqiya, who had authority over the Maghreb (all of North Africa west of Egypt) and al-Andalus.

From the early days of the Muslim conquest of North Africa, Arab commanders had treated non-Arab (notably Berber) auxiliaries inconsistently, and often rather shabbily. When they arrived in North Africa the Umayyads had to face a Christian-majority population in Africa Proconsularis (which became Ifriqiya, modern-day Tunisia) and pagans in the Maghreb al-Aqsa (now Morocco) with Jewish minorities. Some Berbers of the Maghreb quickly converted and participated in the growth of Islam in the region, but the Arab authorities continued to treat them as second-class people.

Although Berbers had undertaken much of the fighting in the Umayyad conquest of Hispania, they were given a lesser share of the spoils and frequently assigned to the harsher duties (e.g. Berbers were thrown into the vanguard while Arab forces were kept in the back; they were assigned garrison duty on the more troubled frontiers). Although the Ifriqiyan Arab governor Musa ibn Nusair had cultivated his Berber lieutenants (most famously, Tariq ibn Ziyad), his successors, notably Yazid ibn Abi Muslim, had treated their Berber forces particularly poorly.

Most grievously, Arab governors continued to levy extraordinary dhimmi taxation (the jizyah and kharaj) and slave-tributes on non-Arab populations that had converted to Islam, in direct contravention of Islamic law. This had become particularly routine during the caliphates of Walid I and Sulayman.

In 718, the Umayyad caliph Umar II finally forbade the levying of extraordinary taxation and slave tributes from non-Arab Muslims, defusing much of the tension. But expensive military reverses in the 720s and 730s had forced caliphal authorities to look for innovative ways to replenish their treasuries. During the caliphate of Hisham from 724, the prohibitions were sidestepped with reinterpretations (e.g. tying the kharaj land tax to the land rather than the owner, so that lands that were at any point subject to the kharaj remained under kharaj even if currently owned by a Muslim).

As a result, resentful Berbers grew receptive to radical Kharijite activists from the east (notably of Sufrite and later Ibadite persuasion) which had begun arriving in the Maghreb in the 720s. The Kharijites preached a puritan form of Islam, promising a new political order, where all Muslims would be equal, irrespective of ethnicity or tribal status, and Islamic law would be strictly adhered to. The appeal of the Kharijite message to Berber ears allowed their activists to gradually penetrate Berber regiments and population centers. Sporadic mutinies by Berber garrisons (e.g. under Munnus in Cerdanya, Spain, in 729-31) were put down with difficulty. One Ifriqiyan governor, Yazid ibn Abi Muslim, who openly resumed the jizya and humiliated his Berber guard by branding their hands, was assassinated in 721.

In 734, Ubayd Allah ibn al-Habhab was appointed Umayyad governor in Kairouan, with supervisory authority over all the Maghreb and al-Andalus. Coming in after a period of mismanagement, Ubayd Allah soon set about expanding the fiscal resources of the government by leaning heavily on the non-Arab populations, resuming the extraordinary taxation and slave-tribute without apologies. His deputies Oqba ibn al-Hajjaj al-Saluli in Córdoba (Al-Andalus) and Omar ibn el-Moradi in Tangier (Maghreb) were given similar instructions. The failure of expensive expeditions into Gaul during the period 732-737, repulsed by the Franks under Charles Martel, only increased the tax burden. The parallel failure of the caliphal armies in the east brought no fiscal relief from Damascus.

The Revolt

Revolt in the Maghreb 

The zeal of the Umayyad tax-collectors finally broke Berber patience. It is reported that following Ubayd Allah ibn al-Habhab's instructions to extract more revenues from the Berbers, Omar ibn al-Moradi, his deputy governor in Tangiers, decided to declare the Berbers in his jurisdiction a "conquered people" and consequently set about seizing Berber property and enslaving persons, as per the rules of conquest, the "caliphal fifth" was still owed to the Umayyad state (alternative accounts report he simply doubled their tribute).

This was the last straw. Inspired by the Sufrite preachers, the North African Berber tribes of western Morocco – initially, the Ghomara, Berghwata and Miknasa – decided to break openly into revolt against their Arab overlords. As their leader, they chose Maysara al-Matghari, alleged by some Arab chroniclers to be a lowly water-carrier (but more probably a high Matghara Berber chieftain).

The only question was timing. The opportunity arose sometime in early 740 (122 AH), when the powerful Ifriqiyan general Habib ibn Abi Ubayda al-Fihri, who had recently been imposing his authority on the Sous valley of southern Morocco, received instructions from the Kairouan governor Ubayd Allah to lead a large expedition across the sea against Byzantine Sicily. Gathering his forces, Habib ibn Abi Obeida marched the bulk of the Ifriqiyan army out of Morocco.

As soon as the mighty Habib was safely gone, Maysara assembled his coalition of Berber armies, heads shaven in the Sufri Kharijite fashion and with Qura'nic inscriptures tied to their lances and spears, and brought them bearing down on Tangiers. The city soon fell into rebel hands and the hated governor Omar al-Moradi was killed. It was at this point that Maysara is said to have taken up the title and pretences of amir al-mu'minin ("Commander of the Faithful", or "Caliph"). Leaving a Berber garrison in Tangier under the command of Christian convert, Abd al-Allah al-Hodeij al-Ifriqi, Maysara's army proceeded to sweep down western Morocco, swelling its ranks with new adherents, overwhelming Umayyad garrisons clear from the Straits down to the Sous. One of the local governors killed by the Berbers was Ismail ibn Ubayd Allah, the very son of the Kairouan emir.

The Berber revolt surprised the Umayyad governor in Kairouan, Ubayd Allah ibn al-Habhab, who had very few troops at his disposal. He immediately dispatched messengers to his general Habib ibn Abi Obeida al-Fihri in Sicily instructing him to break off the expedition and urgently ship the Ifriqiyan army back to Africa. In the meantime, Ubayd Allah assembled a cavalry-heavy column, composed of the aristocratic Arab elite of Kairouan. He placed the nobles under the command of Khalid ibn Abi Habib al-Fihri, and dispatched it to Tangiers, to keep the Berber rebels contained, while awaiting Habib's return from Sicily. A smaller reserve army was placed under Abd al-Rahman ibn al-Mughira al-Abdari and instructed to hold Tlemcen, in case the Berber rebel army should break through the column and try to drive towards Kairouan.

Maysara's Berber forces encountered the vanguard Ifrqiyan column of Khalid ibn Abi Habib somewhere in the outskirts of Tangiers  After a brief skirmish with the Arab column, Maysara abruptly ordered the Berber armies to fall back to Tangier. The Arab cavalry commander Khalid ibn Abi Habiba did not give pursuit, but just held his line south of Tangier, blockading the Berber-held city, while awaiting the reinforcements from Habib's Sicilian expedition.  
 
In this breathing space, the Berber rebels got reorganized and undertook an internal coup. The Berber tribal leaders swiftly deposed (and executed) Maysara and elected the Zenata Berber chieftain, Khalid ibn Hamid al-Zanati as the new Berber "caliph". The reasons for Maysara's fall remain obscure. Possibly the sudden cowardice shown before the Arab cavalry column proved him military unfit, possibly because the puritan Sufrite preachers found a flaw in the piety of his character, or maybe simply because the Zenata tribal chieftains, being closer to the Ifriqiyan frontline, felt they should be the ones leading the rebellion.

The new Berber leader Khalid ibn Hamid al-Zanati opted to immediately attack the idling Ifriqiyan column before they could be reinforced. The Berber rebels under Khalid ibn Hamid overwhelmed and annihilated the Arab cavalry of Khalid ibn Abi Habiba in an encounter known as the Battle of the Nobles, on account of the veritable massacre of the cream of the Ifriqiyan Arab nobility. This is tentatively dated around c. October–November, 740.

The immediate Arab reaction to the disaster shows just how unexpected this reversal was. Upon the first news of the defeat of the nobles, the reserve army of Ibn al-Mughira in Tlemcen fell into a panic. Seeing Sufrite preachers everywhere in the city, the Umayyad commander ordered his nervous Arab troops to conduct a series of round-ups in Tlemcen, several of which ended in indiscriminate massacres. This provoked a massive popular uprising in the hitherto-quiet city. The city's largely Berber population quickly drove out the Umayyad troops. The frontline of the Berber revolt now leaped to the middle Maghreb (Algeria).

The Sicilian expeditionary army of Habib ibn Abi Obeida arrived too late to prevent the massacre of the nobles. Realizing they were in no position to take on the Berber army by themselves, they retreated to Tlemcen, to gather the reserves, only to find that city too was now in disarray. There, Habib encountered Musa ibn Abi Khalid, an Umayyad captain who had bravely stayed behind in the vicinity of Tlemcen gathering what loyal forces he could find. The state of panic and confusion was such that Habib ibn Abi Obeida decided to blame the guiltless captain for the entire mess and cut off one of his hands and one of his legs in punishment.

Habib ibn Abi Obeida entrenched what remained of the Ifriqiyan army in the vicinity of Tlemcen (perhaps as far back as Tahert), and called upon Kairouan for reinforcements. The request was forwarded to Damascus.

Caliph Hisham, hearing the shocking news, is said to have exclaimed: "By God, I will most certainly rage against them with an Arab rage, and I will send against them an army whose beginning is where they are and whose end is where I am!"

Coup in al-Andalus 

It is sometimes reported that the Andalusian governor Uqba ibn al-Hajjaj dispatched an Andalusian army across the straits to support the Ifriqiyan column around Tangiers, only to be similarly defeated by the Berber rebels in late 740. But this story has been discounted by modern historians, as it is sourced principally from later al-Andalus chronicles; there is nothing in contemporary accounts referencing any such expedition.

Nonetheless, the news of the Berber victory in Morocco echoed through al-Andalus. Berbers heavily outnumbered Arabs in al-Andalus. Fearing the Berber garrisons in their own lands might take inspiration from their Moroccan brethren, the Andalusian Arab elite quickly deposed Obeid Allah's deputy, Uqba ibn al-Hajjaj, in January 741 and reinstated his predecessor, Abd al-Malik ibn Katan al-Fihri, a more popular figure among local Arabs and Berbers alike.

The Syrian Expedition

In February, 741, the Umayyad Caliph Hisham appointed Kulthum ibn Iyad al-Qasi to replace the disgraced Obeid Allah as governor in Ifriqiya. Kulthum was to be accompanied by a fresh Arab army of 30,000 – 27,000 raised from the regiments (junds) of Syria and an additional 3,000 to be picked up in Egypt. Caliph Hisham appointed Kulthum's nephew Balj ibn Bishr al-Qushayri as his lieutenant and designated successor, and the Jordanian commander Thalaba ibn Salama al-Amili as his second successor (should tragedy befall the prior two).

The elite Syrian cavalry under Balj ibn Bishr, which had moved ahead of the bulk of the forces, was the first to arrive in Kairouan in the Summer of 741. Their brief stay was not a happy one. The Syrians arrived in haughty spirits and quarreled with the Kairouan city authorities, who suspicious, had given them a rather cool reception. Interpreting it as ingratitude, the Syrian barons imposed themselves on the city, billeting troops and requisitioning supplies without regard to local authorities or priorities.

(It is pertinent to note that the members of the Syrian expedition were of different tribal stock than the Arabs they came to save. The early Arab colonists of Ifriqiya and al-Andalus had been drawn largely from tribes of south Arabian origin (known as Kalbid or 'Yemenite' tribes), whereas the Syrian junds were mostly of north Arabian tribes (Qaysid or Mudharite, or 'Syrian' tribes). The ancient and deep pre-Islamic tribal rivalry between Qaysid and Yemenite found itself invoked in repeated quarrels between the earlier colonists and the arriving junds.)
 
Moving slower with the bulk of the forces, Kulthum ibn Iyad himself did not enter Kairouan, but merely dispatched a message assigning the government of the city to Abd al-Rahman ibn Oqba al-Ghaffari, the qadi of Ifriqiya. Collecting the Syrian vanguard, Kulthum hurried along to make junction with the remaining Ifriqiyan forces (some 40,000) of Habib ibn Abi Obeida al-Fihri holding ground in the vicinity of Tlemcen.

The junction between the North African and Eastern forces did not go smoothly. News of the Syrian misbehavior in Kairouan had reached the Ifriqiyan troops, while the Syrians, incensed at the poor reception, treated their Ifriqiyan counterparts in a high-handed fashion. Habib and Balj bickered and the armies nearly came to blows. By smooth diplomacy, Kulthum ibn Iyad managed hold the armies together, but the mutual resentments would play a role in subsequent events.

The Berber rebel army, under the leadership of Khalid ibn Hamid al-Zanati (perhaps jointly with a certain Salim Abu Yusuf al-Azdi ), while boasting great numbers (some 200,000), were very poorly equipped. Many Berber fighters had nothing but stones and knives, dressed in a mere loin cloth, heads shaved in puritan fashion. But they made up for this in knowledge of the terrain, excellent morale, and a fanatical Sufrite-inspired religious fervor.

The Berber and Arab armies finally clashed at the Battle of Bagdoura (or Baqdura) in October-November, 741, by the Sebou river (near modern Fes). Disdaining the experience and cautious advice of the Ifriqiyans, Kulthum ibn Iyad made several serious tactical errors. Berber skirmishers dehorsed and isolated the Syrian cavalry, while the Berber foot fell upon the Arab infantry with overwhelming numbers. The Arab armies were quickly routed. By some estimates, two-thirds of the Arab army were killed or captured by the Berbers at Bagdoura. Among the casualties were the new governor Kulthum ibn Iyad al-Qasi and the Ifriqiyan commander Habib ibn Abi Obeida al-Fihri.

The Syrian regiments, now reduced to some 10,000, were pulled together by Kulthum's nephew, Balj ibn Bishr and scrambled up towards the straits, where they hoped to get passage across the water to al-Andalus. A small Ifriqiyan contingent, under Habib's son Abd al-Rahman ibn Habib al-Fihri, joined the Syrians in their flight, but the rest of the Ifriqiyan forces fled in a scattered way back to Kairouan. The bulk of the Berber rebel army set off in pursuit of the Syrians, and laid siege to them in Ceuta.

Offensive on Kairouan 

The Zenata Berber leader Khalid ibn Hamid al-Zanati who delivered the two great victories over the Arab armies disappears from the chronicles shortly after Bagdoura (741). But news of the defeat emboldened hitherto quiet Berber tribes to join the revolt. Berber uprisings erupted across the Maghreb and al-Andalus.

The most immediate threat arose in southern Ifriqiya, where the Sufrite leader Uqasha ibn Ayub al-Fezari raised a Berber army and laid sieges to Gabès and Gafsa. By a rapid sally south with the remnant of the Ifriqiyan army, the Kairouan qadi Abd al-Rahman ibn Oqba al-Ghaffari managed to defeat and disperse Uqasha's forces near Gafsa in December, 741. But the qadi possessed far too few Arab troops to put up a pursuit, and Uqasha immediately set about re-assembling his forces quietly around Tobna in the Zab valley of western Ifriqiya.

Immediately after hearing of the disaster at Bagdoura, the Caliph Hisham ordered the Umayyad governor of Egypt, Handhala ibn Safwan al-Kalbi, to quickly take charge of Ifriqiya. In February 742, Handhala ibn Safwan hurried his Egyptian army westwards and reached Kairouan around April 742, just as Uqasha was returning to try his luck again. Handhala's forces pushed Uqasha back again.

When Uqasha was reassembling his forces once more in the Zab, he came across a large Berber army coming from the west, under the command of the Hawwara Berber chieftain Abd al-Wahid ibn Yazid al-Hawwari (possibly dispatched by the Berber caliph Khalid ibn Hamid al-Zanati, although he is not mentioned in the chronicles). Abd al-Wahid's army was composed of some 300,000 Berber troops, ostensibly the largest Berber army ever seen. After a quick consultation, Uqasha and Abd al-Wahid agreed on a joint attack on Kairouan, Uqasha taking his forces along a southerly route, while Abd al-Wahid led his large army through the northern passes, converging on Kairouan from both sides.

Hearing of the approach of the great Berber armies, Handhala ibn Safwan realized it was paramount to prevent their junction. Dispatching a cavalry force to harass and slow down Abd al-Wahid in the north, Handhala threw the bulk of his forces south, crushing Uqasha in a bloody battle at al-Qarn and taking him prisoner. But Handhala had taken a lot of losses himself, and now faced the unhappy prospect of Abd al-Wahid's gigantic army. Hurrying back, Handhala is said to have put the entire population of Kairouan under arms to bolster his ranks, before setting out again. In perhaps the bloodiest encounter in the Berber wars, Handhala ibn Safwan defeated the great Berber army of Abd al-Wahid ibn Yazid at al-Asnam around May 742 (perhaps a little later), just three miles outside of Kairouan. Some 120,000-180,000 Berbers, including Abd al-Wahid, fell in the field of battle in that single encounter. Uqasha was executed shortly after.

Although Kairouan was saved for the caliphate, and with it the core of Ifriqiya, Handhala ibn Safwan now faced the unenviable task of dragging the more westerly provinces, still under Berber sway, back into the fold. He would not have the chance to accomplish this.

Revolt in al-Andalus 

The coup installing Abd al-Malik ibn Qatan al-Fihri as ruler in al-Andalus in early 741 had been a failsafe device. But once the news of the disaster at Bagdoura spread, a general Berber uprising in al-Andalus could no longer be prevented. In October 741, Berber garrisons north of the Douro River mutinied. They discarded their Arab commanders and took to the field, abandoning their garrison posts to assemble their own Berber rebel army around the center and march against the Andalusian Arabs in the south.

Although their leaders' names have escaped us, the Andalusian Berber rebel army was organized into three columns – one to take Toledo (the main garrison city of the Central March), another to aim for Córdoba (the Umayyad capital), and the third to take Algeciras, where the rebels hoped to seize the Andalusian fleet to ferry additional Berber troops from North Africa.

With the frontier garrisons in the northwest suddenly evacuated, the Christian king Alfonso I of Asturias could hardly believe his luck, and set about dispatching Asturian troops to seize the empty forts. With remarkable swiftness and ease the northwest was captured, and the banks of the upper Ebro were raided by Alfonso and permanently lost to al-Andalus. The Asturians devastated several towns and villages on the banks of the Douro River, and carried off local populations from the towns and villages in the Galician-Leonese lowlands back to the mountains, creating an empty buffer zone in the Douro River valley (the Desert of the Duero) between the Asturias in the north and al-Andalus in the south. This newly emptied frontier would remain in place for the next few centuries. It is alleged that pastoral Berber mountaineers remained behind in the highlands around Astorga and León. These trapped Berber communities were called "Maragatos" by the local Christian Leonese (etymology uncertain, possibly from mauri capti, "captive Moors"). Although eventually converted to Christianity, the Maragatos retained their distinctive dress, customs and lifestyle of Berber origin down to the early modern era.

The Syrians in Al-Andalus 

Through much of the winter of 741-42, the remnant of the Syrian expedition, some 10,000 men, under Balj ibn Bishr, remained trapped in Ceuta, besieged by the Berber rebels. The Andalusian ruler Abd al-Malik ibn Qatan al-Fihri, wary that the presence of the Syrians in Al-Andalus would only aggravate matters.

But news soon reached the Andalusian governor that the Berber rebel armies from the northwest had been organized and were now barreling south in three columns, towards Toledo, Córdoba and Algeciras.

Not having enough Arab forces at hand, the Andalusian governor Abd al-Malik realized he had little choice but to make use of the stranded Syrian force to defeat the Berber armies. In a carefully negotiated treaty, Abd al-Malik granted the Syrians permission to cross over, on the condition that they promise to return to North Africa within a year of the settlement of the Berber matter in Al-Andalus. Hostages were taken to secure Syrian compliance.

The Syrian junds under Balj ibn Bishr crossed the straits in early 742 and immediately headed to the environs of Medina-Sidonia, where they intercepted and disposed of the Berber column aiming for Algeciras. The Syrians then joined the Andalusian Arabs in crushing the main Berber rebel army in a ferocious battle outside of Córdoba in the Spring of 742. Shortly after, they proceeded to defeat the third Berber army, then laying siege to Toledo.

The Berber rebellion was quashed in Al-Andalus, but the Syrians showed no signs of intending to leave. When the Andalusian governor Abd al-Malik ibn Qatan ibn Fihri pressed the point, Balj ibn Bishr, decided to simply depose him and proclaim himself governor, invoking his credentials as designated successor to his uncle, the late Ifriqiyan governor Kulthum ibn Iyad al-Qasi. In revenge for the merchant of Ceuta, Balj ordered the elderly Ibn Qatan tortured to death.

A civil war was not short in happening. Rallied by Qatan and Umayya, the sons of the late Fihrid governor, Andalusian Arabs took up arms against the Syrian junds. The Syrians delivered a decisive defeat upon the Andalusian at the Battle of Aqua Portora outside of Córdoba in August 742, but Balj ibn Bishr was mortally wounded in the field. Command of the Syrian armies devolved to Thalaba ibn Salama al-Amili, and for the next few months, the Syrians remained bunkered down, while the Andalusians (soon joined by what remained of the Beber rebels), assembled in Mérida.

Much of the next few months was spent in an internecine Arab civil war, the Berber question relegated to a secondary concern. Eventually, tiring of war, the parties, appealed to the Ifriqiyan emir Handhala ibn Safwan al-Kalbi to resolve the matter. Handhala dispatched his cousin Abu al-Khattar ibn Darar al-Kalbi as the new governor for al-Andalus. Abu al-Khattar arrived in May 743 and immediately set about restoring peace in Al-Andalus, liberating prisoners (Arab and Berber) and figuring a resolution to the displaced Syrian troops. He decided to distribute the various Syrian junds across Al-Andalus, carving out regimental fiefs in hitherto thinly-held areas: the Damascus jund was established in Elvira (Granada), the Jordan jund in Rayyu (Málaga and Archidona), the Palestine jund in Medina-Sidonia and Jerez, the Emesa (Hims) jund in Seville and Niebla and the Qinnasrin jund in Jaén. The Egypt jund was divided between Beja (Algarve) in the west and Tudmir (Murcia) in the east. (Al-Maqqari refers to an additional jund from Wasit (Iraq) that was settled in Cabra, but this jund is not recorded in other sources). The Syrian junds were allocated a third of the tax revenues collected in their regions, and given responsibilities of tax-collection and military service to the Andalusian governor.

The arrival of the Syrian junds would have tremendous implications for subsequent Andalusian history. They increased substantially the Arab element on the Iberian peninsula, and, as such, were instrumental in deepening the Muslim hold on the south, what would become the heart of al-Andalus. But they also brought trouble. Unwilling to be governed, the Syrian junds carried on an existence of autonomous feudal anarchy, severely destabilizing the power of the governor of al-Andalus.

Later years

It is common to denote 742 or 743 as the "end" of the Great Berber Revolt, after the failure of the Berber armies to seize Kairouan or Córdoba. But the Berber hold on Morocco, as well as the western and central parts of the Maghrib al-Awsat (Central Maghreb, modern-day Algeria) would continue, leading to the establishment of the Barghwata state in Tamesna by 744, Abu Qurra's state in Tlemcen by 742 and the Midrarid emirate in Sijilmassa by 758, while Arab hold would last over Al-Andalus and Ifriqiya, including the eastern part of modern-day Algeria.

Later, non-Berber dynasties came to power with Berber support, such as the Rustamids, a dynasty of Persian descent who by 761 established an Imamate over the area of Tahert, in modern-day Algeria, and the Sharifian Idrisids in Morocco, by 789 considered as the founder dynasty of the modern Moroccan state.

By this era, though not organized as states, many areas were ruled by Kharijite rebels such as Djerba, Wargla, Setif, Tozeur, Gafsa and the Djebel Nafusa.

See also
 Battle of Bagdoura
 Battle of the Nobles
 Muslim conquest of the Maghreb
 Berbers and Islam

Notes

Sources

al-Maqqari (1840-43 transl. by P. de Gayangos) The History of the Mohammedan dynasties in Spain, 2 vols, London: Royal Asiatic Society.
Blankinship, Khalid Yahya (1994). The End of the Jihad State: The Reign of Hisham Ibn 'Abd Al-Malik and the Collapse of the Umayyads. SUNY Press. 
 Fournel, Henri (1857) Étude sur la conquête de l'Afrique par les Arabes, Paris, Impermerie Imperiale.
Heath, Jeffrey M (2002). Jewish and Muslim Dialects of Moroccan Arabic. London: Routledge. 
 Holt, P M, Lambton, Ann K S. and Lewis, Bernard (1977). The Cambridge History of Islam. Cambridge University Press. 
Hrbek, Ivan (1992), Africa from the Seventh to the Eleventh Century, 3rd, University of California Press,
Ibn Khaldun (1852 transl.) Histoire des Berbères et des dynasties musulmanes de l'Afrique, Algiers.
Lévi-Provençal, E. (1950)Histoire de l'Espagne musulmane, Tome 1, 1999 ed., Paris: Larose.
Julien, Charles-André, Histoire de l'Afrique du Nord, des origines à 1830, édition originale 1931, réédition Payot, Paris, 1961
Kennedy, Hugh (1996) Muslim Spain and Portugal: A Political History of al-Andalus, New York and London: Longman.
 Mercier, E. (1888) Histoire de l'Afrqiue septentrionale, V. 1, Paris: Leroux. Repr. Elibron Classics, 2005.
Roth, A M and Roth, Norman (1994). Jews, Visigoths and Muslims in Medieval Spain: Cooperation and Conflict. Brill Academic Publishers. 
 Taha, Abd al-Wahid Dhannun (1989) The Muslim conquest and settlement of North Africa and Spain, London, Routledge.

 
8th-century rebellions
Rebellions by ethnic group
739
740
741
742
743
8th century in the Umayyad Caliphate
730s conflicts
740s conflicts